Sir Alfred Farthing Robbins (Launceston 1 August 1856 - 9 March 1931) was a British journalist, political biographer and freemason.

He was initiated in 1888 in Gallery Lodge No. 1928, which catered for members of the Press Gallery of the House of Commons, and in 1901 became Master of that lodge. As President of the Board of General Purposes from 1913 until his death, he was described as "the Prime Minister of English Freemasonry". London correspondent of the Birmingham Daily Post since 1888, he was president of the Institute of Journalists in 1908, and has been chairman of its Orphan Fund since 1911. He received a knighthood in 1917.

His portrait, painted by Philip Tennyson Cole, presented by the Institute of Journalists in 1931, is kept at Launceston Guildhall and Town Hall. He was a member of the National Liberal Club. 

He married Ellen Pitt (born 1862 in Hitchin) in 1882, and was the father of Alfred Gordon Robbins, Helen Robbins, Alan Pitt Robbins, Grenville Robbins and Clifton Robbins (1890-1964), the journalist, barrister, and writer of golden age detective fiction.

His wife Ellen was the daughter of Ann and John Pitt who ran the White Horse Pub, 19 High St, in Hitchin, Hertfordshire.

Works

 Five Years of Tory Rule: A Lesson and a Warning (1879) 
 Practical politics; or, The liberalism of to-day (1888) 
 Launceston, Past and Present (1888)
 The early public life of William Ewart Gladstone: four times prime minister (1894) 
 English-Speaking Freemasonry (1930)

References

1856 births
1931 deaths
Freemasons of the United Grand Lodge of England
English biographers
Knights Bachelor
People from Launceston, Cornwall